The Lou Ellen Parmelee House is a historic Queen Anne style house located at 570 Archer St. in Monterey, California.

It was listed on the National Register of Historic Places in 1998.  The house was deemed significant "as the best remaining example of Late Victorian Queen Anne high style residential design in Monterey", and also for the craftsmanship of its interior and exterior finishes, artistically.  Built in 1896, it is well-preserved, with a 1946 extension removed in 2006.

References 

Houses on the National Register of Historic Places in California
Houses on the National Register of Historic Places in Monterey County, California
Queen Anne architecture in California
Houses completed in 1896
Houses in Monterey County, California
Buildings and structures in Monterey, California
National Register of Historic Places in Monterey County, California